Tawanda Kanhema (born ) is a Zimbabwean photographer and product manager. He helped map 500 miles of Zimbabwe for Google Street View as a volunteer.

Early life and education
Tawanda Kanhema is from the city of Salisbury, Zimbabwe. He studied documentary film-making and journalism at University of California, Berkeley.

Career
As of 2019, Kanhema was a product manager in Silicon Valley. In 2009, he noticed that Zimbabwe was not represented on Google Street View. He subsequently volunteered to carry the Street View gear across  of Zimbabwe so that it would be more complete and representative. He captured images in Zimbabwe via helicopter, speedboat, bicycling, car, and hiking. Kanhema acted as a volunteer for Google for this project, spending US$5,000 of his own money to travel and take the pictures for Street View. In March 2019, he was paid by the Mushkegowuk Council of northern Ontario to document the ice roads connecting their villages for Street View. Kanhema views his efforts as part of a wider effort to make Zimbabwe more attractive and accessible to tourists.

Personal life
In 2009, Kanhema moved from Zimbabwe to the US. He lived in Berkeley, California as of 2019.

External links 
 TED Speaker Biography

References

1980s births
People from Harare
University of California, Berkeley alumni
Zimbabwean emigrants to the United States
Living people